Makoma Lekalakala is a South African activist who is the director of the Johannesburg branch of Earthlife Africa. Along with Liz McDaid, she was awarded the 2018 Goldman Environmental Prize for the African region for their work on using the courts to stop a Russian-South African nuclear deal in 2017.

Early life 
Lekalakala grew up in Soweto, South Africa. She had five siblings, and was raised by her mother after her father died in 1976. She became increasingly aware of social issues and injustices as she saw her mother struggle to put food on the table and her community denied electricity from the local power station because of apartheid attitudes.

Career 
In 1983, Lekalakala gained experience in community organizing as a shop steward for the Commercial Catering and Allied Workers Union. She joined Earthlife Africa in 2007 and began developing a forum for women to join public discussion around energy and climate change issues.

References

South African environmentalists
South African women environmentalists
South African women business executives
Goldman Environmental Prize awardees
Living people
Year of birth missing (living people)